Alexander Horn may refer to:
Alexander Horn (1762–1820), secret agent monk
Alex Horn (1929–2007), cult leader, playwright and actor
Alexander horn aka Alex horn, musical instrument
Alexander horned sphere, mathematical concept
Alexander Horne, Governor of the Isle of Man 1713–1723
Alex Horne (born 1978), British comedian

Horn, Alexander